Carlo Barassi (1910-?) was an alpine ski racer from Italy.

Biography
Graduated in engineering in 1933 at the age of 23, he worked for Pirelli. Passionate about skiing, so much so that he was the first Italian in history to have taken part in the Alpine World Ski Championship in Mürren 1931, he provided the idea for the invention of the ski rack.

Furthermore, in 1948 he patented the ribbons for Olivetti typewriters and in 1959 he patented the winter snow tires, the Pirelli BS3 tire.

World Championships results
Barassi closed in last place all three races in which he participated.

See also
 Arflex

References

External links
 Pirelli, storie di uomini e di invenzioni: Carlo Barassi at Pirelli Foundation 

1910 births
Date of death missing
Italian male alpine skiers
20th-century Italian engineers
20th-century Italian inventors